The Kap Shui Mun Bridge (KSMB) in Hong Kong, part of Lantau Link of Route 8, is one of the longest cable-stayed bridges in the world that transports both road and railway traffic, with the upper deck used for motor vehicles and the lower deck used for both vehicles and the MTR. The bridge was completed in 1997.

Structural information 

The total length of the Kap Shui Mun Bridge includes a  approach span on the Lantau side. There is a column in each of the back spans of the cable stayed bridge, making four  spans, adding to the  main span. This makes the total length . The  Ma Wan Viaduct was constructed under the same contract as the KSMB. The viaduct connects the KSMB to the Tsing Ma Bridge, forming the Lantau Link, which was built to provide access to the new airport.

The Kap Shui Mun Bridge is not symmetrical, in that the  back span length (two  spans) is less than half of the main span length (which would be ). To provide the balance that symmetry will normally provide, part of the bridge has a composite structure. The center  of the main span uses a steel-concrete composite to make the structure lighter. The back spans and the rest of the main span are concrete. Using the lighter steel cross section in the majority of the main span serves to equalize the horizontal forces on the towers and balance the bridge.

Because the lower deck carries both rail and traffic, the cross section is designed as a Vierendeel truss. This means that there are no diagonal members in the cross section and that vehicles and rail cars drive through the openings provided by the Vierendeel design.

Along with the Tsing Ma Bridge and Ting Kau Bridge, it is closely monitored by the Wind and Structural Health Monitoring System (WASHMS).

Concrete strength of towers: Grade 50/20 or 50MPa

Crane strike
The bridge has a height restriction of 41 metres for vessels passing underneath. On 23 October 2015, a barge attempted to pass under the bridge with a broken-down crane that could not be lowered. The crane had a maximum height of 43 metres, but was tilted slightly to 41 metres. The bridge has an actual clearance of 47 metres, but potentially due to the high tide and wave action, the crane struck the bridge and damaged its underside. The Tsing Ma Bridge has a higher height clearance of 53 metres but a source said the captain of the tugboat towing the barge may have opted to take Kap Shui Mun to save time.

The strike triggered the Ship Impact Detection System to issue an alarm and both the road and railway were shut down immediately, severing Lantau Island and the airport from the city from about 7:40 pm to 10:00 pm. The government's contingency plan to implement emergency ferry service between Tsuen Wan and Tung Chung failed as the ferry operator took almost two hours to ready the service. Some travelers attempted to reach the airport via the Discovery Bay Ferry Pier, although many missed their flights.

The Highways Department inspected the bridge and found that only the inspection platform rails were damaged by the collision, and that the structural integrity of the bridge was not jeopardised. In the days following the incident there were calls in local media for the government to build a second link to the airport. In fact, such a link was already under construction: the Tuen Mun–Chek Lap Kok Link road tunnel was being constructed as part of the Hong Kong–Zhuhai–Macau Bridge project. This opened in 2020.

See also
 List of tunnels and bridges in Hong Kong

References

External links

 
 Yokogawa Bridge project page

Bridges completed in 1997
Double-decker bridges
Bridges in Hong Kong
Route 8 (Hong Kong)
Road-rail bridges
Railway bridges in Hong Kong
Cable-stayed bridges in Hong Kong
Tsuen Wan District
Vierendeel truss bridges